Earl Vann (October 18, 1913 – October 1, 1985) was a Democratic member of the Pennsylvania House of Representatives.
  He was elected to Philadelphia City Council in 1975.  He was defeated in 1979 and went on to work as a salesman at a sporting goods store

References

Democratic Party members of the Pennsylvania House of Representatives
1913 births
1985 deaths
20th-century American politicians